Peter Frankenfeld (born Willi Julius August Frankenfeldt on 31 May 1913 in Berlin – 4 January 1979 in Hamburg) was a German comedian, radio and television personality.

After World War II he became an interpreter with the U.S. military government. In 1948 he went into broadcasting. He pioneered quiz programs on West German radio and television, becoming the country's best-known programme host and entertainer. He is remembered for some classic sketches such as "Der Überzieher" (about a man getting in trouble in a restaurant because he has to constantly guard his overcoat), "Die Bürgschaft" (his bumbling attempt to recite Schiller's poem The Hostage), or "Die Wetterkarte" (The Weather Chart, where he speaks in a wide variety of German dialects).

In 1962, he and director Heinz Dunkhase discovered the comedy sketch Dinner for One in Blackpool which was staged in Frankenfeld's live show shortly thereafter, and recorded on 8 July 1963. The show was re-run occasionally on German television until it got its fixed spot on New Year's Eve in 1972.

He was married to the singer Lonny Kellner.

External links 
 Peter Frankenfeld in German National Library
 Peter Frankenfeld in Internet Movie Database
 Peter Frankenfeld

1913 births
1979 deaths
Male actors from Berlin
German male comedians
German radio personalities
German television personalities
Officers Crosses of the Order of Merit of the Federal Republic of Germany
German game show hosts
20th-century comedians
ZDF people
Norddeutscher Rundfunk people
Hessischer Rundfunk people
People from Friedrichshain-Kreuzberg